Tiamat is a Swedish metal band that formed in Stockholm in 1987 and led by Johan Edlund. The band went through a number of stylistic changes, usually leaning toward gothic metal.

History
Initially, the band had the name Treblinka and a style of black/death metal. After having recorded the album Sumerian Cry in 1989, vocalist/guitarist Johan Edlund and bassist Jörgen Thullberg parted ways with the other two founding members, and subsequently changed the name to Tiamat. The Sumerian Cry album included re-recorded Treblinka songs and was released in June 1990. AllMusic refers to early Tiamat as "one of the leading lights in symphonic black metal."

After the debut, Edlund's leadership would modify the band's style with influences ranging from Black Sabbath, Mercyful Fate, Candlemass, Pink Floyd and King Crimson, with Sumerian lyrical themes. H. P. Lovecraft's writings also appear to have influenced Tiamat's thematology, a development consistent with a broader trend in death metal culture. Polish guitarist Waldemar Sorychta would produce and contribute instrumentation to many of the band's albums, as well as those by Tiamat's own tour and labelmates, including Moonspell, Rotting Christ, Lacuna Coil and Samael.

1994's critically acclaimed Wildhoney mixed raw vocals, slow guitar riffs and synthesizer sounds which sounded different from other extreme metal bands active at that time. An almost continuous forty-minute piece of music, Wildhoney led to the band's appearances at the Dynamo and Wacken Open Air heavy metal festivals in 1995. The group would play a second gig at Dynamo two years later.

Upon the release of A Deeper Kind of Slumber (1997), Edlund relocated from Sweden to Germany and declared himself the only permanent member of the band; all albums that would follow would cement the band into a more gothic rock sound, quite different from the extreme music they did in the years before, with recent albums showing a Sisters of Mercy and Pink Floyd influence.

The band signed to Nuclear Blast in June 2007, and released their ninth album Amanethes on 18 April 2008.

On 10 August 2008, Thomas Wyreson announced that he was quitting the band, stating that "it's just kinda hard to make everything work with the family etc."

Their song "Cain" was also featured in the 2004 video game Vampire: The Masquerade – Bloodlines.

The band's tenth full-length studio album, The Scarred People, was released on 2 November 2012 through Napalm Records.

Members 

Current members
Johan Edlund – vocals, guitars, keyboards, theremin 
Lars Sköld – drums 
Anders Iwers – bass guitar 
Roger Öjersson – guitars, keyboards, mandolin, backing vocals 

Past members
Jörgen "Juck" Thullberg – bass guitar 
Anders Holmberg – drums 
Stefan Lagergren – guitars 
Niklas Ekstrand – drums 
Thomas Petersson – guitars 
Johnny Hagel – bass guitar 
Kenneth Roos – keyboards 
P.A. Danielsson – keyboards 

Current touring members
Jonas Öijvall – keyboards 
Rikard Zander – keyboards   
Former touring members
Nicke Andersson – drums 
Martin Brändström – keyboards 
Henrik Bergqvist – guitars 
Fredrik Åkesson – guitars  
Henriette Bordvik – female vocals 
Martin Powell – keyboards  
Johan Niemann – guitars 
Joakim Svalberg – keyboards   

Timeline

Discography

Studio albums

Singles

EPs

Live albums

Compilation albums

Video albums

Music videos

References

External links

Century Media Records artists
Musical groups established in 1987
Nuclear Blast artists
Napalm Records artists
Swedish gothic metal musical groups
Swedish gothic rock groups
Swedish black metal musical groups
Swedish death metal musical groups